Edgar Hugh Graham (19 January 1897 – 13 November 1957) was an Australian politician and  a member of the New South Wales Legislative Assembly from  1941 until his death . He was a  member of the Labor Party and held numerous ministerial positions. He was the Minister for Agriculture for 13 years.

Graham was born in Wagga Wagga, New South Wales and was the son of a farmer. He was educated to elementary level at state schools and initially worked as a butcher. He later worked as a stock agent and pig breeder. Graham was elected to the New South Wales Parliament as the Labor member for Wagga Wagga at the 1941 state election. He defeated the sitting Country Party member, Matthew Kilpatrick in the landslide victory that allowed William McKell to form a government. He held the seat at the next five elections and died as the sitting member in 1957. During the premierships of McKell, James McGirr and Joseph Cahill, Graham held various ministerial portfolios, most notably his long tenure as Minister for Agriculture.

References

 

1897 births
1957 deaths
Members of the New South Wales Legislative Assembly
Australian Labor Party members of the Parliament of New South Wales
20th-century Australian politicians
Australian stock and station agents